Palafox is a somewhat uncommon surname that originated in Spain and may refer to:
 Palafoxia, a genus of flowering plants from the sunflower family
 Antonio Palafox (born 1936), Mexican tennis player
 Manuel Palafox (1886–1959), Mexican politician
 José de Palafox y Melzi, Duke of Saragossa (1775-1847), Spanish general
 Juan de Palafox y Mendoza (1600–1659), Spanish bishop, politician and writer in colonial Mexico
 Luis Rebolledo de Palafox y Melci, 1st marqués de Lazán (1772-1843), Spanish general